Dalkurd Fotbollsförening, commonly known as Dalkurd FF or simply Dalkurd is a Swedish football club based in Uppsala. The club plays in the Ettan Norra, which is the third tier of football in the country. On 26 September 2004, the club was originally founded by members of the Kurdish diaspora in Borlänge, Dalarna.

On 24 November 2017, Dalkurd chose to move their senior team operations to Uppsala, some 140 kilometers southeast of Borlänge, where they will play at the new ground Nya Studenternas IP following its opening in 2020. In the 2018 season, however, Dalkurd played their home games at Gavlevallen in Gävle, some 110 kilometers north of Uppsala (and roughly 110 kilometers east of Borlänge). Dalkurd FF holds the record for the lowest average attendances in the history of both Allsvenskan and Superettan, the two highest Swedish leagues. Dalkurd FF is affiliated with Upplands Fotbollförbund.

History
The club was formed in Borlänge in 2004 by a group of Kurds. It started as a social project to contribute to the youth of Borlänge by offering activities for them. IK Brage helped financing the project. In the first season the squad consisted of an average age of 17 years. Besides contributing to the youngsters, the chairman, Ramazan Kizil, had high expectations of the football players and an ultimate goal: he wanted to take Dalkurd to the professional levels of the Swedish league. Dalkurd won every division they participated in from their very first season in 2005 to 2009. Owing to this uncommon success they got a lot of media attention, both in Sweden and abroad.

The club narrowly avoided catastrophe when travelling home from Spain in March 2015. The club had initially intended to fly from Barcelona to Düsseldorf on Germanwings Flight 9525, but changed its booking at the last minute when they decided the layover in Germany would be too long. Flight 4U 9525 crashed into the French Alps on 24 March, killing everyone on board.

Season to season

Supporters

In 2010, the official supporter club from Västerås for Dalkurd FF with the name "Roj Fans" was founded. They are an independent non-profit organisation.

In 2018, they set the record for the lowest average attendance ever – 1,058 – in the history of the highest Swedish league, Allsvenskan. The record was previously held by Västerås IK, who had an average attendance of 1,125 in the inaugural season 1924–25. The game against BK Häcken with an attendance of 202 people also became the second lowest attendance in the history of the league.

In 2019, they set the record for the lowest average attendance in the history of Superettan – 168 people.

Affiliated clubs

Affiliated clubs
 Division 4
 Uppsala-Kurd FK

In 2019, Dalkurd FF announced a cooperation with Uppsala-kurd FK as part of strengthening the presence of Dalkurd FF in the Uppsala region. One of the aims of the cooperation is to make a natural way for talents in Uppsala to become a part of Dalkurd. Uppsala Kurd plays in div. 4 Uppland and is a farm team for Dalkurd FF.
Players from the Dalkurd Academy regularly train with Uppsala Kurd. If they are good enough, a transition is made so that they can represent Uppsala Kurd in the series game. The goal is to bring Uppsala Kurd higher up in the series system. We want to be able to offer young players good senior match environments on the way to Dalkurd FF want Uppsala Kurd A in div 3, 2020 and then the goal is to come up in the second in a few years.
The football played and the training methodology in Uppsala Kurd is the same as in Dalkurd A and the Dalkurd Academy.

Crest
The crest consist of a round circle with the flag of Kurdistan as well as two Dalecarlian horses. "Dal" and "Kurd FF" is spelled out in white letters on the top and bottom of the crest, as well as the year 2004.

Kit
The traditional home colors of Dalkurd are all green. The Away kit is traditionally white but have previously been black, yellow and pink in the 2019 season.
The club's kit manufacturer is Adidas

Honours

Players

Current squad

Notable former players

David Abidor (born 1992)

Academy 

 Deven Rashed 
 Edvard Ståhlberg

Personnel

List of the managers
 Elvan Cicen (2006)
 Tomas Blomberg (2007–08)
 Bernhard Brcic (2009)
 Lasse Ericsson (2010)
 Anders Sjöö (2010–11)
 Johan Sandahl (2011)
 Jonas Björkgren (2012)
 Robert Mambo Mumba (2013)
 Andreas Brännström (2014–15)
 Poya Asbaghi (2016–2017)
 Andreas Brännström (2017)
 Azrudin Valentić (2018)
 Johan Sandahl (2018)
 Paul Olausson (2019–2020)
 Mesut Meral (2021)
 Yasin Aras (2021)
 Dalibor Savic (2022)
 Amir Azrafshan (2022-)

Attendances

In recent seasons Dalkurd FF have had the following average attendances:

* Attendances are provided in the Publikliga sections of the Svenska Fotbollförbundet website.

References

External links

Roj Fans Official website
Dalkurd FF – Laget.se

 
2004 establishments in Sweden
Association football clubs established in 2004
Football clubs in Uppsala County
Sport in Uppsala
Diaspora football clubs in Sweden
Kurdish diaspora in Europe